Virginie Pouchain (born 1980 in Saint-Montan, Ardèche), is a singer and hairdresser from the département of Ardèche in southern France. On 14 March 2006 she was selected by the viewers of France 3 and a jury presided by Charles Aznavour to represent France in Eurovision Song Contest 2006. For the French national grand finale, she sang Céline Dion's hit song Pour que tu m'aimes encore. In Athens, Virginie performed a song – written especially for the occasion by the German-born singer Corneille –  entitled Il était temps  (It's about time). She finished in the third-to-last position scoring only five points.

External links 
   
  Eurovision Song Contest – France (official)
  France 3 – Eurovision page (official)
  France at Eurovision Song Contest – Eurovision page (non-official)

Eurovision Song Contest entrants for France
Eurovision Song Contest entrants of 2006
French hairdressers
1980 births
People from Ardèche
Living people
21st-century French singers
21st-century French women singers